Swindle is a surname. Notable people with the surname include:

Christina Swindle (born 1984), American swimmer
Clinton Howard Swindle (1945–2004), investigative journalist and editor for The Dallas Morning News and author
Gerald Swindle, American professional bass angler
Liz Lemon Swindle, (born 1953), American painter
Orson Swindle (born 1937), American Vietnam War veteran and former government official

See also
Swindler (surname)
Swindell
Swindall

Surnames from nicknames